The Bukhtarma (بۇقتىرما,) is a river of Kazakhstan. It flows through East Kazakhstan Region, and is a right tributary of the Irtysh. The source of the river is in the Southern Altai Mountains.

The Bukhtarma Dam is on the Irtysh a few kilometers downstream from the mouth of Bukhtarma. The lower course of the Bukhtarma has thus become of bay of the reservoir produced by the dam.

References

Rivers of Kazakhstan
East Kazakhstan Region